The Thornapple River is a river in Michigan.

Thornapple River may also refer to:

 Thornapple River (Wisconsin)

See also 
 Little Thornapple River (disambiguation)
 Thornapple (disambiguation)